Jacqueline Hick ('Jackie; 1919–2004) was an Australian painter whose work is held in the permanent collections of multiple museums in Australia. She is known for her work depicting human figures and the Australian landscape. She is the subject of the 2013 book Jacqueline Hick: Born Wise.

Early life and career 
Hick studied at several places include the South Australian School of Art, the London Central School of Art, Académie Montmartre in Paris. Her time in England, France, and Italy spanned the period between 1948 and 1950. In 1950, she worked in the Hexagon group with fellow Australia artists John Dowie, David Dridan, Francis Ray Thompson, Douglas Roberts, and Pam Cleland. Dowie sculpted a bronze of Hick that was in the National Gallery of Victoria, and wrote a poem in her honor. She also trained with the Australian artist Ivor Hele, and in the 1960s studied in the USA and Mexico.

From 1968 until 1976 Hick was a trustee at the Art Gallery of South Australia, the second woman to hold this position after Ursula Haywood.

Art work 
Hick identified with the Antipodeans, Australia artists working on the themes of "isolation, drought, exploration, pioneers, and colonial crime". Her work ranges from landscape to portrait. She increasingly showed the human suffering of the Indigenous Australians, and the adverse effects of metropolitan life on its inhabitants. Hick's work is mentioned multiple times in art historian Bernard Smith's 2001 book on Australian painting. Hick's work is part of the permanent collection of the following museums:

 National Gallery of Australia,
 National Gallery of Victoria,
 Art Gallery of South Australia,
 Art Gallery of New South Wales,

Hick's art has also been presented in temporary shows, notably at the Royal South Australian Society of Arts Gallery, 2–30 March 1994, and in London in a show with other Australian artists. Her work is also found in the London Guild Hall, the Mertz Collection in the United States, and the Raymond Burr Collection in the United States. In 2000, one of her pieces sold for $27,600, a new record for her work.

In 2013 a book covering Hick's life, Catherine Hick: Born Wise, was published. Earlier, her life and work had been the subject of an MA thesis.

Awards and honors 
In 1953 Hick won a prize in a Dunlop competitions for her water color works, and won again in 1955 and 1956. In 1958, she won the Melrose Memorial Prize, a prize for portraits given by the South Australian Society of Arts. She won the Cornell Prize twice, in 1958 for her piece Horse Destroyed and in 1960 for Corridor. In 1960 she also won the Caltex prize at the Adelaide Arts Festival. In 1962 and again in 1964 she won the Vizard-Wholohan prize. In the 1995 Queen's Birthday Honours in Australia, she was award a Member of the Order of Australia (1995), with a citation that read "For service to art as an artist and teacher".

Personal life 
She was married to Frank Galazowski (d. 1987), and the couple had four children.

References

External links 
A selection of Hick's artworks
Jacqueline Hick interviewed by Hazel de Berg – audio recording

Members of the Order of Australia
1919 births
2004 deaths
Artists from Adelaide
20th-century Australian women artists